The 2009 Clarkson Cup was contested at the K-Rock Centre in Kingston, Ontario. The Minnesota Whitecaps competed versus the Montreal Stars in the championship game. It was the first time that the Clarkson Cup was contested. At the time of the NHL lockout, Adrienne Clarkson suggested that women should play for the Stanley Cup.

Championship game
Montreal beat the Minnesota Whitecaps by a 3-1 tally at the K-Rock Centre.  The Stars goal scorers included Shauna Denis, Sabrina Harbec, and Caroline Ouellette. Three-time American Olympian Angela Ruggiero logged the lone tally for the defeated Whitecaps. Harbec scored the game-winning goal against Minnesota goalie Sanya Sandahl. Ouellette's goal was assisted by Marie-Philip Poulin.

Olympians in the Clarkson Cup
The following players also played for their respective countries in ice hockey at the 2010 Winter Olympics.

See also
 Clarkson Cup
 Minnesota Whitecaps

References

Clarkson Cup
Clarkson Cup
Sport in Kingston, Ontario
2009